Amblyseius calidum is a species of mite in the family Phytoseiidae.

References

calidum
Articles created by Qbugbot
Animals described in 2000